Mount Defiance is a peak near the Columbia River Gorge in the US state of Oregon. The northern and western flanks of the mountain are in the Mark O. Hatfield Wilderness.

Mount Defiance is composed chiefly of lava flows. The base is basalt from an old shield volcano, and it is capped by andesite.

The mountain was named by Dr. P.G. Barrett, an early resedent of Hood River Valley, since he believed it retained its winter snow late into the spring in defiance of the warming weather.

References

External links 
 

Defiance
Landforms of Hood River County, Oregon